Kothamangalam Seenu (17 February 1910 - 30 August 2001) was a Tamil Stage, Cinema actor and a Carnatic music singer.

Early life
Kothamangalam Seenu whose birth name is V. S. Srinivasan, was born in Vathirairuppu (anglicised as ‘Watrap'), a village in Virudhunagar district, Tamil Nadu. His parents were Subramaniya Iyer and Narayani Ammal. Not much is known about his early life at his birth place except that he was well trained in Carnatic music.
He went to Kothamangalam, a village in Pudukottai district in search of employment.

Career
He started his career as a singer and recorded some gramophone records. He gave concerts and also trained students in Carnatic music.
Later he joined with Kothamangalam Subbu and began acting in dramas with him.

Film career
His melodious voice and expertise in Carnatic music attracted film producers. Soon, he began to act in films.
The first film that he acted was Sarangadhara, released in 1937. He acted in the main character.
During the early years of Tamil Cinema, music and songs dominated the films. In some cases there were as many as 50, 60 songs in one film. Therefore, there was much scope for singers to act in films and Seenu had good opportunities.
However, there were already two big 'guns' who mesmerized people with their golden voice and acting skill.
M. K. Thyagaraja Bhagavathar and P. U. Chinnappa were considered 'Super Stars' and held by the people in high esteem.
But Kothamangalam Seenu established a place for himself as a singer actor.
After Sarangadhara, he acted in Pattinathar and Vipra Narayana. His songs in Shantha Sakkubai, released in 1939,  became very popular. He delivered a musical discourse (கதா காலட்சேபம்) that was a hit.
He acted in the main role as Thirumangai Alvar in the film with the same name and was released in 1940. His songs in this film were popular.
He acted in several films during the 1940s. His last film 'Thulasi Jalandar' was released in 1947.
Thereafter, though he lived for more 50 years, he did not act in any films.

But he was performing Carnatic music concerts on Radio.

Filmography
The following list of films is based on information in Tamil Movie Database.

References

External links
Map of Kothamangalam
நடிப்பும் பாடலும் இவரின் தனிமுத்திரை, திருமலை மூர்த்தி, சிறப்பு ஒலிபரப்புச் சேவை, 1 ஏப்ரல் 2015
கொத்தமங்கலம் சீனு
Katcha Devayani (1941)

Some of his songs on YouTube
 https://www.youtube.com/watch?v=3IKpWbffZio
 https://www.youtube.com/watch?v=4gBnoUfgRp8 
 https://www.youtube.com/watch?v=4bG70TRGKA4

Tamil male actors
Tamil singers
Male Carnatic singers
Carnatic singers
Indian Tamil people
1910 births
2001 deaths
People from Virudhunagar district
Indian male stage actors
Male actors in Tamil cinema
20th-century Indian male actors
20th-century Indian male singers
20th-century Indian singers